Sixaola is a district of the Talamanca canton, in the Limón province of Costa Rica. It is a border town together with Guabito, Panamá  Sixaola is right across the Sixaola River from Guabito, Panama.

History 
Sixaola was created on 19 February 1970 by Decreto Ejecutivo 13.

Geography 
Sixaola has an area of  km2 and an elevation of  metres.

Locations
Poblados: Ania, Boca Sixaola, Catarina, Celia, Daytonia, Gandoca, Margarita, Mata de Limón, Noventa y Seis, Palma, Paraíso, Parque, San Miguel, San Miguelito, San Rafael, Virginia, Zavala.

Demographics 

For the 2011 census, Sixaola had a population of  inhabitants.  The surrounding area is home to the Bribri Indians.

Transportation

Road transportation 
The district is covered by the following road routes:
 National Route 36

Route 36 goes onward to Panamá, where it becomes Panama Route 1001.

Economy

Tourism
Tourists pass through Sixaola and Guabito along a road connecting destinations in Limón Province, Costa Rica and Bocas del Toro Province, Panama. The road is an old elevated railroad grade. A former railroad bridge crosses the Rio Sixaola at the border. Costa Rican customs is located at the west end of the bridge just down some stairs from the elevated railroad grade. When crossing the border in either direction, tourists must clear both Costa Rican and Panamanian customs. Entry and exit visas are required. Panamanian customs is located alongside the elevated railroad grade right at the east end of the bridge.

The border towns have no accommodations, restaurants, or services. In Costa Rica, Puerto Viejo offers the closest accommodations, restaurants, and services to the border. Buses and taxis wait on both sides of the border.

Image gallery

References 

Districts of Limón Province
Populated places in Limón Province
Costa Rica–Panama border crossings